Islam Khametov (born 12 October 1993) is a Russian judoka.

He is the bronze medallist of the 2017 Judo Grand Slam Ekaterinburg in the -66 kg category.

References

External links
 
 

1993 births
Living people
Russian male judoka
20th-century Russian people
21st-century Russian people